The 1876 college football season had no clear-cut champion, with the Official NCAA Division I Football Records Book listing Yale as having been selected national champions. On November 11, organized intercollegiate football was first played in the state of Pennsylvania as Princeton defeated Penn 6–0 in Philadelphia.  This season was notable in the history of American football as it saw Walter Camp, widely considered to be the "Father" of the sport, participate as a freshman on the Yale team.

Conference and program changes

Conference standings

References